Daniel Rowbottom (born 18 February 1989) is a British racing driver currently competing in the British Touring Car Championship. He debuted in 2019, after spending the previous two and a half seasons in Renault Clio Cup United Kingdom. Daniel Rowbottom is a Full Member of the BRDC. (British Racing Drivers Club).

Racing record

Complete British Touring Car Championship results
(key) Races in bold indicate pole position (1 point awarded – 2002–2003 all races, 2004–present just in first race) Races in italics indicate fastest lap (1 point awarded all races) * signifies that driver lead race for at least one lap (1 point awarded – 2002 just in feature races, 2003–present all races)

NASCAR

Whelen Euro Series – EuroNASCAR PRO
(key) (Bold – Pole position. Italics – Fastest lap. * – Most laps led. ^ – Most positions gained)

References

External links
 https://danielrowbottom.com/

1989 births
Living people
British Touring Car Championship drivers
English racing drivers
British racing drivers
Britcar drivers
Sportspeople from Kidderminster
Renault UK Clio Cup drivers
NASCAR drivers